Daniel Adán Fedorczuk Betancour (born 2 May 1976) is a Uruguayan professional football referee. He has been a full international for FIFA since 2011. He refereed some matches in Copa Libertadores.

Fedorczuk was initially named as one of three reserve officials for the 2016 Copa América Centenario, but eventually served as a match official during the tournament, notably refereeing the 6 June match between Argentina and Chile.

References 

1976 births
Living people
Uruguayan football referees
Uruguayan people of Polish descent
Place of birth missing (living people)
Uruguayan people of Ukrainian descent
Copa América referees